David A. King (born 14 November 1941) is an English mathematician, Arabist who specialised in Islamic World's history of Science. 

He was the Professor of Near Eastern Languages and Literatures and History of Science at New York University (1979-85) and the director of the Smithsonian Institution project on medieval Islamic astronomy and Director of the Institute for the History of Science in Johann Wolfgang Goethe University.

Biography 
At an early age he decided not to follow in the footsteps of his father, Henry C. King (1915 - 2005), author of The History of the Telescope (1956) and the first director of the London Planetarium and later of the McClaughlin Planetarium in Toronto. Instead he learned Arabic and went off to the Near East and then to the U.S to immerse himself in Medieval Islamic Studies. However, after one year of graduate school he found himself, not unwillingly, deeply entrenched in the field of the History of Astronomy, ecstatic with what he had found in the first medieval Arabic scientific manuscripts that he encountered. These first discoveries made in 1970 are now documented on MuslimHeritage.org. Thus began his journey into the then undocumented area of what he has called “astronomy in the service of Islam”.

His basic education was at Royal Grammar School, High Wycombe (1952–59), where from age 14 onward he studied only mathematics, physics and chemistry, and from age 16-18 only mathematics (he has long regarded this kind of specialisation for children as ridiculous). Before going to university he worked as a ‘Werkstudent’ at Carl Zeiss in Oberkochen (1960). He then studied Mathematics at Jesus College, Cambridge (B.A. 1963), Education at Oxford University (Dip.Ed. 1964), and Near Eastern Languages and Literatures at Yale University (Ph.D. 1972). In between studying he travelled extensively in W. and E. Europe and the Near East. His first appointment was with the Sudan Government Ministry of Education (Atbara and El-Fasher, Darfur, 64-67). Thereafter he directed a project in the history of Islamic astronomy funded by the Smithsonian Institution (Foreign Currency Program) at the American Research Center in Egypt (72-79), cataloguing the 2,500 medieval Arabic scientific manuscripts in the Egyptian National Library and using Cairo as a base for research in manuscript libraries all over the world. His first university position was as Associate Professor, then Full Professor, of Near Eastern Languages and Literatures at New York University (1979–85). In 1985 he was invited to become Professor of History of Science and Director of the Institute for the History of Science, Johann Wolfgang Goethe University, Frankfurt am Main. The Institute flourished as one of the leading centres in the world for unrestricted research in the history of Islamic science but was closed when he retired in 2007.

Research on aspects of the history of Islamic science  
King's mentor in medieval Arabic and Islamic Studies at Yale University was Prof. Franz Rosenthal, who gave him photos of an Istanbul manuscript of a mathematical text by Samaw’al al-Maghribî for his first assignment. His mentor in the History of Science and his doctoral advisor was Prof. Bernard R. Goldstein, who encouraged him to investigate for his dissertation the Hâkimî Zîj of the 10th-century Egyptian astronomer Ibn Yûnus. A zîj is an astronomical handbook containing tables mainly for solar, lunar, planetary and stellar astronomy, together with explanatory text. The zîjes of al-Khwârizmî (Baghdad, ca. 830) and al-Battânî (Raqqa, ca. 910) are the best-known examples (because they became known in medieval Europe) but they are hardly the best or most interesting examples. In 1956 Prof. Edward S. Kennedy of the American University of Beirut had published a survey of some 125 zîjes, and King was able to augment this number by a few dozen during visits to libraries around the world and whilst collaborating with Prof. Kennedy in Beirut, Cairo and Frankfurt. This most fundamental research on the Islamic astronomical heritage is currently being brought to a conclusion with a grand total of some 225 zîjes' from al-Andalus to India and from the Yemen to Central Asia by Dr. Benno van Dalen of the Bavarian Academy of Sciences in Munich. The number and scope and variety of these works attest to the phenomenal interest of Muslim astronomers in the technical aspects of their subject.

King's doctoral research uncovered a vast number of manuscripts of tables not from zîjes but for timekeeping and regulating the times of prayer for Cairo associated with Ibn Yûnus, as well as related tables for Damascus, Jerusalem, Tunis, Taiz, and elsewhere. His later research led to the first regional histories of astronomy in Egypt, Syria, the Yemen, and the Maghreb.

The main thrust of King's research over close to 50 years has been the documentation, by means of hundreds of previously-unstudied Arabic manuscripts, of the ways in which astronomy – not only mathematical astronomy but also non-mathematical folk astronomy – was used over the centuries in the service of Islam: the regulation of the lunar calendar; the organisation of the five daily prayers; and the determination of the sacred direction (qibla) toward the sacred Kaaba in Mecca. These studies led to an understanding of the reasons behind the definitions of the times of the day-light prayers in terms of shadow increases over the midday minimum, as well as the reasons for the often curious orientations of medieval mosques.

The first volume of his magnum opus entitled In Synchrony with the Heavens (2004) contains the first descriptions of the astronomical tables used by Muslim astronomers for timekeeping by the sun and stars and the regulation of the astronomically-defined times of Muslim prayer throughout the year for different localities. The sophistication of some of these tables and instruments is remarkable, especially those that are universal, in the sense of serving all latitudes. Also remarkable is the way in which Muslim astronomers tabulated all conceivable functions relevant to the problems of spherical astronomy. The vast majority of these tables were unknown in medieval Europe, which is why they have only come to light in modern times.

Research on astronomical instruments
The second volume of King's In Synchrony with the Heavens (2005) deals with the instruments that they also used: sundials, astrolabes and quadrants. Detailed descriptions of all known instruments from the Islamic East up till 1100 are presented as well as of many historically-important later ones. Many of these are scientific works of art. Pride of place is taken threefold by (1) the spectacular astrolabe of the 10th-century astronomer Hâmid ibn Khidr al-Khujandî, made in Baghdad in 984; (2) the quintuply-universal astrolabe of Ibn al-Sarrâj, constructed in Aleppo in 1327 (the most sophisticated astrolabe ever made); (3) and a 14th-century astrolabe with inscriptions in Hebrew, Latin and Arabic, made in Toledo and then taken to Algiers.

King was the first to study medieval astronomical instruments, first Islamic ones, then European ones, as historical sources deserving the same respect as manuscripts. Several of the most historically important ones had been declared suspicious or fake by colleagues who did not know the language of instruments. An astrolabe signed by a late-13th-century Yemeni sultan al-Ashraf had been declared a fake because “there was no astronomy in the Yemen”. In fact, it is one of six astrolabes described by the Sultan's teachers in a text appended to a highly sophisticated treatise on the construction and use of the astrolabe authored by the Sultan al-Ashraf himself. The oldest Latin astrolabe, from 10th-century Catalonia, desperately needed to be reinstated after it had been declared a fake by scholars versed only in the medieval astrolabe textual tradition. King published lists of all known medieval instruments, Islamic and Western, arranged chronologically by region (as far as this is possible), to facilitate future research, as well as catalogue in preparation, now available online. He also was able to show that various instruments long thought to have been of medieval European inspiration, such as the universal horary quadrant with movable solar-calendrical scale (12th-century Spain) and the universal horary device for timekeeping by the sun known as the navicula de Venetiis (14th-century England) were actually devised in 9th-century Baghdad, as was the universal horary device for timekeeping by the stars.

A forgotten number notation from the Middle Ages
A 14th-century French astrolabe from Picardy featuring all numbers in ingenious monastic ciphers, merited a book (The Ciphers of the Monks) (2002). This documents the origins of the notation in Ancient Greek tachygraphy through Cistercian monasteries in England and what is now the border country between Belgium and France during the Middle Ages down to its afterlife in Renaissance books. The remarkable notation enables each digit from 1 to 9,999 to be represented by a unique cipher.

The first scientific instrument of the Renaissance, not a fake but the key to the most enigmatic painting of the Quattrocento

The beautiful little astrolabe dedicated by the young German astronomer Regiomontanus to his sponsor the Greek Cardinal Bessarion in Rome in 1462 (deemed suspicious by ‘experts’ after it had been auctioned at Christie's on the strength of an accurate expert description!) is one out of a dozen astrolabes from the same Vienna school preserved in museums around the world. An image of an angel defied identification until it was realised that Bessarion had been named after an early Egyptian saint who was venerated as an angel in the Byzantine liturgy. Furthermore, the Latin dedication is an acrostic with hidden meanings and the vertical axes of the acrostic define eight spaces containing letters that identify (more than once) the eight persons depicted in the enigmatic ‘Flagellation of Christ’ by Piero della Francesca. It seems that the concept of the painting and the persons depicted in it were derived from the epigram. The painting is polysemous, as are the images of the eight persons in it and even the statue of a classical god atop the column behind Jesus. This explains the difficulty it has presented to historians of art over 200 years. Some 50 different interpretations of the identities of the three moderns on the right of the painting have been proposed, and not a few of these have now been shown to be appropriate, even when they are mutually inconsistent. To understand the astrolabe and its Latin inscription and the nature and significance and potential of the acrostic and the letter combinations it contains is essential before one can begin to appreciate the persons portrayed in the painting. Having deciphered these Renaissance games, we now know, for example, that the angel featured on the astrolabe, St. Bessarion, inspired the angelic figure in the painting, who represents Regiomontanus as well as three recently deceased youths from Bessarion's circle. King does not expect that these revelations, documented in "Astrolabes and Angels, Epigrams and Enigmas" will be digestible for art historians.

In 2013 King was awarded the Koyré Medal of the Académie internationale d'histoire des sciences for his life's work.

Personal
King is married since 1969 to Patricia Cannavaro King and the couple have two sons and one granddaughter. He currently resides between Frankfurt city-centre and a small village in Southern France.

Bibliography 
His publications in book form are:

Mathematical astronomy in medieval Yemen (1983)

A Survey of the scientific manuscripts In the Egyptian National Library (1986 - this is a key to the 2000-page Arabic catalogue from 1981–86, arranged as a supplement to the standard bio-bibliographical sources of H. Suter, C. Brockelmann, C. A. Storey, and F. Sezgin)

From Deferent to Equant: A volume of studies in the History of Science of the Ancient & Medieval Near East in Honor of E. S. Kennedy (co-editor with George Saliba) (1986)

E. S. Kennedy, Colleagues and Former Students: Studies in the Islamic Exact Sciences (co-editor with Mary Helen Kennedy) (1983)

Islamic mathematical astronomy (1986/1993)

Islamic astronomical instruments (1987/1995)

Astronomy In the service of Islam (1993)

Islamic astronomy and geography (2012)

Astrolabes from medieval Europe (2011)

World-Maps for finding the direction and distance to Mecca: Innovation and tradition in Islamic science (1999)

In Synchrony with the Heavens – Studies in astronomical timekeeping and instrumentation in medieval Islamic civilization (2004-05)

The Ciphers of the Monks: A forgotten number notation of the Middle Ages (2001)

Astrolabes and angels, epigrams and enigmas – From Regiomontanus’ acrostic for Cardinal Bessarion to Piero della Francesca's ‘Flagellation of Christ’  (2007)

Some significant articles include the following:

“The orientation of medieval Islamic religious architecture and cities”, Journal for the History of Astronomy 26 (1995): 253-274

“Astronomical handbooks and tables from the Islamic world (750-1900): An interim report” (co-author with Julio Samsó, with a contribution from Bernard R. Goldstein), Suhayl 2 (2001): 9-105

“An astrolabe from 14th-century Christian Spain with inscriptions in Latin, Hebrew and Arabic – A unique testimonial to an intercultural encounter”, Suhayl 3 (2002/03): 9-156

“The cult of St. Wilgefortis in Flanders, Holland, England and France”, in Am Kreuz – Eine Frau, in Ästhetik – Theologie – Liturgik (Münster), 26 (2003): 55-97

References

External links 
  “Islamic Astronomy”
  “Al-Khalili and the Culmination of Spherical Astronomy in 14th-Century Damascus”
  Personal website
  Academia.edu site (several publications available to download)

Alumni of Jesus College, Cambridge
Yale University alumni
New York University people
Living people
1941 births